Jadu (full name Jadula Laciny, name at birth Jadula Freydank) is a German singer, musician and songwriter living in Berlin.

Biography
Jadu was born in August 26th, 1988 in Bissendorf and grew up in Bad Essen. She moved to Osnabrück in 2007 and in 2013 she met Marten Laciny, better known as the rapper Marteria (and his alter ego Marsimoto), who she married in 2015. 

Jadu is a singer, drummer and guitarist. In 2013 she toured with the rapper Chefket as his guitarist, playing e.g. at the Splash Festival.  In 2017 she wrote the title track of Die Toten Hosen's album Laune der Natur, together with her husband and with Campino, singer in Die Toten Hosen.

In 2019 she released the album Nachricht vom Feind which was noticed for its strong symbolism. She describes her musical style as "Military Dream Pop"  and media compares her to Rammstein due to the symbolism.  The debut album contains musical elements from pop as well as from Neue Deutsche Härte and classical music. The German lyrics are provocative and full of military language and BDSM references. The theme of her songs is the deep and dark aspects of love. For example, one of her songs describes the relationship between Eva Braun and Adolf Hitler. 

In 2020 she was the support act on Lindemann's European tour.

Discography
Albums
 2019: Nachricht vom Feind (Album, Deserteur/Groove Attack)
2022 "Modus Operandi
Singles
 2017: Treibjagd (Staatsakt / Caroline / Universal Music)
 2018: Uniform (Deserteur)
 2019: Todesstreifen (Deserteur)
 2019: Friedliche Armee (feat. Nessi; Deserteur)
 2019: Der Feind/Frühling in Schwerin/Die Erlösung (Jadu & das Metropolis Orchester Berlin) (Deserteur)
 2020: Auf drei
 2021: Der goldene Schluss
 2021 Stockholm
Guest artist/Songwriter
 2015: Illegalize It and Usain Bolt (guitar) on Ring der Nebelungen by Marsimoto
 2017: El Presidente (lyrics) and Blue Marlin (backing vocals) on Roswell by Marteria
 2017: Laune der Natur (songwriter) on Laune der Natur by Die Toten Hosen

Gallery

External links

 Official web page

References

Musicians from Berlin
German women musicians
German women singers
1988 births
Living people